Loam was a restaurant and wine bar in Galway, Ireland. It had one Michelin star from 2016 to 2022. In 2023, co-owner Enda McEvoy announced that the restaurant would not be reopening after closing its doors in September 2022, citing staff shortages and spiralling costs as reasons behind the decision.

Awards
 Michelin star: 2016–2022
 National Hospitality Awards, 2015: Best Dining Experience
 Irish Restaurant Awards 2015: Best Emerging Irish Cuisine

See also
List of Michelin starred restaurants in Ireland

References

External links
Official Site

Culture in Galway (city)
Defunct restaurants in Ireland
Michelin Guide starred restaurants in Ireland
Restaurants established in 2013
Restaurants disestablished in 2022